Algonquin Regional High School is a public high school located in Northborough, Massachusetts, United States. The school serves the students of the Northborough-Southborough Regional School District (NSRSD) comprising both Northborough and neighboring Southborough. The school's mascot, as of February 11, 2022, is the Titan. The former mascot was the Tomahawk, known by many as the "T-Hawk." On April 28, 2021, the Northborough-Southborough Regional School Committee voted, 9-0, to retire the Tomahawk as its mascot. A study group was assembled to determine a new mascot, which was voted on by the student body at that time. The school's colors are maroon and gold. Algonquin Regional's Superintendent is Greg Martineau and its Principal is Sean Bevan.

Academics
Algonquin Regional offers its students a multitude of courses within various disciplines such as Mathematics, Science, Applied Arts & Technology, Fine & Performing Arts, Health & Fitness, Foreign Languages (including Spanish, French, and Latin), and Instructional Support.  College Preparatory courses are graded on a 4.0 scale, Honors courses are graded on a 4.5 scale, and Advanced Placement courses are graded on a 5.0 scale.

The following Advanced Placement Courses are offered: 
AP Microeconomics, AP English Literature and Composition, AP English Language and Composition, AP Studio Art, AP Music Theory, AP Calculus AB, AP Calculus BC, AP Statistics, AP Biology, AP Chemistry, AP Environmental Science, AP Human Geography, AP Psychology, AP United States Government and Politics, AP United States History, AP World History, AP Latin, AP Spanish, AP French, AP Computer Science

Athletics
The Titans (then Tomahawks) saw considerable athletic success during the early 2000's, winning seven state titles between 2004 and 2012. The Boys' Soccer team won back-to-back titles in 2004 and 2005, and Boys' Baseball followed up with another title for the third straight year in 2006. The Girls' Tennis and Soccer teams both earned state titles in 2009, and the Girls' Gymnastics added two more titles, again back-to-back in 2011 and 2012.

Algonquin maintains a strong cross-town rivalry with Westborough High School, in which both teams compete in an annual Thanksgiving Day Football Game.

Soccer
The Algonquin Boys' Varsity Soccer team captured two straight MIAA Division I State titles in 2004 and 2005, the first state titles for the entire school.  In 2006, they returned to the state final to play St. John's Preparatory School, but lost 4–1.

The Algonquin girls' soccer team's upset of nationally-ranked Acton-Boxborough Regional High School in the 2009 Massachusetts State Final made local headlines and was even recognized by ESPN.  The girls have come close to another state title three times, first in 2015 when the team played in the title game but lost to Needham 3–1, in 2019 when they lost in the semifinal to Westfield 1–0 in overtime, and in 2022, losing the State Final 1-0 to Hingham.

Tennis
In 2009 the Girls' Varsity Tennis team had an undefeated season and eventually won the state title. That same year, the Boys' tennis team won the Central Massachusetts Division Title but lost to Longmeadow in the state semi-final. In 2010, the Girls' team received a #1 seeding in the state tournament.

Gymnastics
Girls' Varsity Gymnastics became State Champions in 2011 after an undefeated season, being named both League and Sectional Champions, then repeated the same feat in 2012.

Lacrosse
The Boys' lacrosse program won the Central Massachusetts District in 2007 and then again in back-to-back years in 2011 and 2012, however they just fell short of the State Title both times, losing to Eastern Mass champions Medfield High School and Concord-Carlisle High School, respectively.  The Girls' program recently became Central Massachusetts Champions and became the first team in Massachusetts girls lacrosse history to represent Central Massachusetts in the State Final Game; they lost to Eastern Mass powerhouse Westwood High School.

Rugby
The Girls' Rugby team has won the MYRO State championship every year from 2011 to 2015.

Ice Hockey
After upsetting the heavily favored Shrewsbury Colonials 3–2 in a shootout, the boys' ice hockey team won the 2015–2016 Division III Central Massachusetts championship, beating Groton-Dunstable 2–1 in a shootout. They then beat Westfield 6–2 in the state semi-final before falling to Hanover 5–1 at the TD Garden in the State Championship game.

The Girls' Hockey team won the 2022 Division II State Championship after a 2-1 OT win over Canton. It was the team's third-straight overtime victory, defeating Medfield and Winchester in the state semi-final and quarter-final respectively. It was the first state championship in hockey in Algonquin's history.

Volleyball
The 2017 Boys Volleyball team completed an undefeated season, but failed to secure any tournament title.

The Harbinger
The Harbinger is the official student newspaper of Algonquin Regional.  It covers campus-wide events and athletic results in addition to controversial topics within the school. The publication regularly receives honors at the New England Scholastic Press Association conference. The Harbinger won a Gold Crown Award at the Columbia Scholastic Press Association in March 2018 as well as a National Scholastic Press Association Pacemaker award in April 2018 and April 2022.

Sachem
Sachem is the literary and art magazine of Algonquin. It is published once a year and is entirely student-run. All poems, stories, artwork, and photography are contributed voluntarily by students. In the 2010-2011 school year it won the Gold Circle Award from Columbia Scholastic Press Association, a prestigious award for literary magazines.

Notable alumni
 Mark "The Bird" Fidrych — former MLB pitcher; 1976 American League Rookie of the Year
 Ryan Gallant — professional skateboarder
 Dorian McMenemy— Olympic swimmer for the Dominican Republic
 Jon Radoff  — internet entrepreneur and author
 Nathaniel Raymond — human rights investigator and anti-torture advocate
 Mike Sherman — former head coach of the Green Bay Packers
 Shion Takeuchi - creator of Inside Job on Netflix and writer on Gravity Falls

Renovation 

In 2003, a $3 million renovation and expansion plan was approved by the district and renovations began that year.  Due to failures associated with the general contractor, Eastern Contractors Inc., and need for dismissal of the contractor from the project, delays in completion of the renovation project occurred. In 2005, the regional district fired the contractor from the project. The renovations and expansion efforts were completed as a result of efforts by school district representatives in 2008, with the grand opening taking place on September 4 of that year.

References

External links
Algonquin Regional High School website
Northborough-Southborough Regional School District
Algonquin Regional High School PTO

Educational institutions established in 1959
Public high schools in Massachusetts
Schools in Worcester County, Massachusetts
1959 establishments in Massachusetts
Buildings and structures in Northborough, Massachusetts